Aspergillus affinis is a species of fungus in the genus Aspergillus. It is from the Circumdati section. The species was first described in 2011. It has been reported to produce ochratoxin A and penicillic acid.

Growth on agar plates

Apsergillus affinis has been cultivated on both Czapek yeast extract agar (CYA) plates and Malt Extract Agar Oxoid® (MEAOX) plates. The growth morphology of the colonies can be seen in the pictures below.

References 

affinis
Fungi described in 2011